Colleen Schneider (born March 12, 1982 in Syracuse, New York) is a retired American professional mixed martial artist. Colleen was a contestant in season 18 of The Ultimate Fighter reality competition television show.

Early life
She attended Cicero-North Syracuse High School in New York, and graduated from the University of California, Berkeley with a bachelor's degree in physics.  While at Berkeley, Schneider competed in and taught taekwondo, which led her to discover mixed martial arts.

Mixed martial arts career

Strikeforce
On August 13, 2010, she made her debut for the Strikeforce promotion at Strikeforce Challengers 10 in a reserve bout for their one-night Women's Welterweight tournament. She lost to future UFC bantamweight Liz Carmouche via unanimous decision after two rounds.

Super Fight League
After going 1–4 in her first five fights, she signed with the upstart Indian promotion, the Super Fight League at SFL 2 against Cherie Buck in the flyweight division. She won the fight via TKO in the second round.

She then fought Aya Saeid Saber at SFL 6, in which she won after stopping Saber from elbow strikes in the first round.

She then competed against Sanja Sucevic at SFL 14 to crown the first SFL World Women's Flyweight Champion. After using her wrestling to control Sucevic in the first two rounds, Schneider submitted Sanja with a keylock to win her first title.

She later relinquished the title in order to compete to get onto The Ultimate Fighter season 18 reality television show.

The Ultimate Fighter
In May 2013, Dave Meltzer released a list of rumored participants on the upcoming The Ultimate Fighter: Team Rousey vs. Team Tate and Schneider was on the list.  In August 2013, it was confirmed that Schneider was one of the fighters selected to be on The Ultimate Fighter: Team Rousey vs. Team Tate.  In the elimination fight to get into the TUF house, Schneider faced Shayna Baszler and lost via an armbar submission in the first round.

Invicta FC
Schneider made her Invicta Fighting Championships debut on February 27, 2015, against Irene Aldana. She lost the fight via submission in the first round. She returned to Invicta January 16, 2016 with a split decision win over Raquel Pa’aluhi. At Invicta 17 on May 7, 2016 she faced Tonya Evinger for the bantamweight championship but was defeated via unanimous decision.

Bellator MMA
In November 2016 Schneider signed for Bellator. She made her debut against Chrissie Daniels at Bellator 170 on January 21, 2017. She won the fight via anaconda choke submission in the first round.

Schneider faced Kate Jackson at Bellator 182 on August 25, 2017. She lost the fight due to a catastrophic knee injury at the end of the first round. The injury led to a difficult surgery and rehab, after which Schneider chose to retire from the sport. She is now pursuing a PhD in sustainable economics at the Vienna University of Economics and Business.

Titles
2014 – FILA Submission Grappling World Championships 
2014 – SFL Super Fight League World Women’s Bantamweight Champion
2013 – SFL Super Fight League World Women’s Flyweight Champion

Mixed martial arts record

|-
| Loss
| align=center| 11–8
| Kate Jackson
| TKO (knee injury)
| Bellator 182
| 
| align=center| 1
| align=center| 5:00
| Verona, New York, US
| 
|-
| Win
| align=center| 11–7
| Chrissie Daniels
| Submission (anaconda choke)
| Bellator 170
| 
| align=center| 1
| align=center| 1:30
| Inglewood, California, US
| 
|-
| Loss
| align=center| 10–7
| Tonya Evinger
| Decision (unanimous)
| Invicta FC 17: Evinger vs. Schneider
| 
| align=center| 5
| align=center| 5:00
| Costa Mesa, California, US
| For the Invicta FC Bantamweight Championship.
|-
| Win
| align=center| 10–6
| Raquel Pa'aluhi
| Decision (split)
| Invicta FC 15: Cyborg vs. Ibragimova
| 
| align=center| 3
| align=center| 5:00
| Costa Mesa, California, US
| 
|-
| Win
| align=center| 9–6
| Bryanna Fissori 
| Decision (split)
| Pancrase 270
| 
| align=center| 3
| align=center| 5:00
| Tokyo, Japan
|
|-
| Win
| align=center| 8–6
| Diana Reyes 
| TKO (injury)
| AMK III
| 
| align=center| 3
| align=center| 3:51
| Tijuana, Mexico
|
|-
| Win
| align=center| 7–6
| Xiong Jingnan
| Decision (unanimous)
| Kunlun Fight 26
| 
| align=center| 3
| align=center| 5:00
| Chongqing, China
|
|-
| Loss
| align=center| 6–6
| Irene Aldana
| Submission (rear-naked choke)
| Invicta FC 11: Cyborg vs. Tweet
| 
| align=center| 1
| align=center| 1:05
| Los Angeles, California, US
| 
|-
| Win
| align=center| 6–5
| Brenda Gonzales
| Decision (unanimous)
| SFL 35
| 
| align=center| 5
| align=center| 5:00
| Tacoma, Washington, US
| <small> Won inaugural SFL America Women's bantamweight championship
|-
| Loss
| align=center| 5–5
| DeAnna Bennett
| Submission (rear-naked choke)
| Showdown Fights 14- Heavyweight Collision 
| 
| align=center| 1
| align=center| 3:02
| Orem, Utah, US
| 
|-
| Win
| align=center| 5–4
| Christina Marks
| Submission (armbar)
| SCMMA3 - Fight to the End
| 
| align=center| 2
| align=center| 3:15
| Ontario, California, US
| <small>Move to bantamweight
|-
| Win
| align=center| 4–4
| Sanja Sucevic
| Submission (americana)
| SFL 14
| 
| align=center| 3
| align=center| 2:54
| Mumbai, India
| <small>Won inaugural SFL flyweight championship
|-
| Win
| align=center| 3–4
| Aya Saeid Saber
| TKO (elbows)
| SFL 6
| 
| align=center| 1
| align=center| 3:55
| Mumbai, India
| 
|-
| Win
| align=center| 2–4
| Cherie Buck
| TKO (punches and elbows)
| SFL 2
| 
| align=center| 2 
| align=center| 2:29
| Chandigarh, India
| |
|-
| Loss 
| align=center| 1–4
| Vanessa Mariscal
| Submission (neck crank) 
| BEP 4
| 
| align=center| 3
| align=center| 1:40
| Fletcher, North Carolina, US
| 
|-
| Win
| align=center| 1–3
| Amber Mann
| TKO (punches)
| Gladiator Challenge - Warpath
| 
| align=center| 1
| align=center| 0:17
| Placerville, California, US
| 
|-
| Loss
| align=center| 0–3
| Casey Noland
| Decision (unanimous)
| UWC - Ultimate Women Challenge
| 
| align=center| 3
| align=center| 3:00
| St. George, Utah, United States
| 
|-
| Loss 
| align=center| 0–2
| Liz Carmouche
| Decision (unanimous) 
| Strikeforce Challengers: Riggs vs. Taylor
| 
| align=center| 2
| align=center| 3:00
| Phoenix, Arizona, US
| 
|-
| Loss 
| align=center| 0–1
| Sarah D'Alelio
| Submission (rear-naked choke) 
| FE - Arctic Combat 2
| 
| align=center| 2
| align=center| N/A
| Fairbanks, Alaska, US
|

References

External links
 
 Colleen Schneider at Invicta FC

1982 births
Living people
American female mixed martial artists
American female taekwondo practitioners
American Muay Thai practitioners
Female Muay Thai practitioners
American female sport wrestlers
American submission wrestlers
American catch wrestlers
American practitioners of Brazilian jiu-jitsu
Female Brazilian jiu-jitsu practitioners
Mixed martial artists from New York (state)
Sportspeople from Syracuse, New York
University of California, Berkeley alumni
Flyweight mixed martial artists
Bantamweight mixed martial artists
Mixed martial artists utilizing taekwondo
Mixed martial artists utilizing Muay Thai
Mixed martial artists utilizing catch wrestling
Mixed martial artists utilizing Brazilian jiu-jitsu
Kunlun Fight MMA Fighters
21st-century American women